The Hāwea River is a river of New Zealand, draining Lake Hāwea into the Clutha/Matau-au.

The river's flow is set by the Lake Hawea Control Dam, an earth embankment 30m high and 390m long that enables water to be released when wanted for the Clyde Dam further downstream.

See also
List of rivers of New Zealand

References

Rivers of Otago
Rivers of New Zealand
Tributaries of the Clutha River